Samu Balázs (1906–1981) was a Hungarian actor.

Selected filmography
 Liliomfi (1954)
 In Soldier's Uniform (1957)
 Háry János (1965)
 Stars of Eger (1968)
 Cats' Play (1972)
 Csontváry (1980)

External links

1906 births
1981 deaths
Hungarian male film actors
Hungarian male television actors
People from Huedin
20th-century Hungarian male actors